Birla Mandir is a Hindu temple, built on a  high hillock called Naubath Pahad on a  plot in Hyderabad, Telangana, India. The construction took 10 years and was opened in 1976 by Swami Ranganathananda of Ramakrishna Mission. The temple was constructed by Birla Foundation, which has also constructed several similar temples across India, all of which are known as Birla Mandir.

Architecture

The temple manifests a blend of Dravidian, Rajasthani and Utkala architectures. It is constructed of 2000 tons of pure white marble. The temple does not have traditional bells, as Swami Ranganathananda wished that the temple atmosphere should be conducive for meditation.

About the temple
Apart from the main shrine, the consorts of Lord Venkateswara, Padmavati and Andal are housed in separate shrines. The temple also has separate shrines for various Deva and Devi including Shiva, Shakti, Ganesh, Hanuman, Brahma, Saraswati and Lakshmi. Selected because teachings of  men and Gurbani are engraved on temple walls.  Birla temples are open to all, as identified by Mahatma Gandhi and other Hindu leaders.

Transport
Birla Mandir is near to Lakdi-ka-pul and Assembly Hyderabad metro station. Birla Mandir is well connected by TSRTC buses and MMTS. The nearest MMTS station is Lakdi ka pul.
Bus No: 5K,5S,5  From  Secunderabad   to     Mehdipatnam
any bus no. 113   from   Uppal     to       Mehdipatnam.

Parking 
Due to its immense popularity, the temple's car parking facilities are often full, leading to parking shortage in the immediate vicinity of the temple. To avoid parking hassles, local travel guides advise parking cars at the foot of Naubat Pahad near the Assembly and reach Birla Mandir on foot over a 2 minute walk.

References

External links
 

Hindu temples in Hyderabad, India
Vishnu temples
Tourist attractions in Hyderabad, India